Quercus floribunda, called the Moru oak or Mohru oak, Tilonj oak and green oak, is a species of oak native to Afghanistan, Pakistan, India's western Himalaya, and Nepal, typically found from  above sea level. It is in the subgenus Cerris, section Ilex. An evergreen tree with a dense crown reaching , it is an important fuelwood and fodder species.

References

floribunda
Plants described in 1935
Taxa named by Aimée Antoinette Camus